Gert Kaasik better known as Mäkki, is an Estonian-born Finnish rapper and DJ.

Mäkki, born in Tallinn, and living in Finland, came to prominence in the summer of 2013, when he released a music video and his own version of the Sini Sabotage hit "Levikset repee" followed by his version of Musta Barbaari hit "Salil eka salil vika" Mäkki published later singles and music videos for "Dippaa", "Kalenteris Tyhjää" and "Grilli Kuumana" making him even more popular. He released his solo album Ihan pomona on 20 February 2015 with collaborations from Kube, Ruma, Adi L Hasla, Tippa-T, Kuningas Pähkinä, Setä Tamu, Super Janne and Sini Sabotage. The album peaked at number 11 on the Finnish Albums Chart.

Discography

Albums

Singles

References

Finnish rappers
Finnish DJs
Living people
Musicians from Tallinn
Singers from Tallinn
Estonian expatriates in Finland
Electronic dance music DJs
Year of birth missing (living people)